Duke Regional Hospital (DRH), located in northern Durham, North Carolina is a general-services hospital that has been part of the Duke University Health System since 1998.  The hospital has 369 beds and over 500 physicians on the medical staff, and has a certified Level II Intensive Care Nursery.

History
The hospital opened to patients on October 3, 1976, as Durham County General Hospital, replacing the smaller Lincoln and Watts Hospitals, which closed on the same date.

In 1998, an agreement with Duke University Health System was signed and the two officially began a 20-year partnership.

On July 1, 2013, Durham Regional Hospital became renamed to Duke Regional Hospital as part of a marketing plan to rebrand its image.

It is not a publicly funded hospital.

References

External links
 Duke Regional Hospital
 Duke Health

Hospital buildings completed in 1976
Hospitals in Durham, North Carolina
Teaching hospitals in North Carolina
Regional Hospital
Education in Durham, North Carolina